= Ayobamidele =

- Gender: Unisex
- Language: Yoruba

Origin
- Meaning: 'my joy has followed me home'
- Region of origin: Nigeria

Other names
- Short form: dele

Ayobamidele (Yoruba: Ayọ̀bámidélé, pronounced [ājɔ̀bámīdélé]) is a Yoruba given name of Nigerian origin. It means 'my joy has followed me home' or 'joy has come with me.' The name is commonly used among the Yoruba people of southwestern Nigeria.
